OTU domain containing 6B is a protein that in humans is encoded by the OTUD6B gene.

OTUD6B is a functional deubiquitinating enzyme, a class of protease that specifically cleaves ubiquitin linkages, negating the action of ubiquitin ligases. OTUD6B, also known as DUBA5, belongs to a DUB subfamily characterized by an ovarian tumor domain (OTU). OTUD6B function may be connected to growth and proliferation. This hypothesis is supported by a recent study indicating that OTUD6B knock out mice, obtained through exon 4 deletion, are subviable and smaller in size.  In humans, OTUD6B mutations have been connected to an intellectual disability syndrome associated with dysmorphic features.

Previous studies on model organisms (see below) cannot be verified by this editor.

Model organisms have been used in the study of OTUD6B function. A conditional knockout mouse line, called Otud6btm1a(EUCOMM)Wtsi was generated as part of the International Knockout Mouse Consortium program — a high-throughput mutagenesis project to generate and distribute animal models of disease to interested scientists.

Male and female animals underwent a standardized phenotypic screen to determine the effects of deletion. Twenty five tests were carried out on homozygous mutant adult mice, however no significant abnormalities were observed.

References

Further reading 
 
 
 
 

Genes mutated in mice